In enzymology, a 5-O-(4-coumaroyl)-D-quinate 3'-monooxygenase is an enzyme that catalyzes the chemical reaction

trans-5-O-(4-coumaroyl)-D-quinate + NADPH + H+ + O2  trans-5-O-caffeoyl-D-quinate + NADP+ + H2O

The 4 substrates of this enzyme are trans-5-O-(4-coumaroyl)-D-quinate, NADPH, H+, and O2, whereas its 3 products are trans-5-O-caffeoyl-D-quinate, NADP+, and H2O.

This enzyme belongs to the family of oxidoreductases, specifically those acting on paired donors, with O2 as oxidant and incorporation or reduction of oxygen. The oxygen incorporated need not be derived from O2 with NADH or NADPH as one donor, and incorporation of one atom o oxygen into the other donor.  The systematic name of this enzyme class is trans-5-O-(4-coumaroyl)-D-quinate,NADPH:oxygen oxidoreductase (3'-hydroxylating). Other names in common use include 5-O-(4-coumaroyl)-D-quinate/shikimate 3'-hydroxylase, and coumaroylquinate(coumaroylshikimate) 3'-monooxygenase.  This enzyme participates in phenylpropanoid biosynthesis.

References 

 

EC 1.14.13
NADPH-dependent enzymes
Enzymes of unknown structure
Hydroxycinnamic acids metabolism